The Roentgen Building is an office building on the Bocconi University campus in Milan, Italy.

History 
The building, ultimated in 2008, was designed by Shelley McNamara and Yvonne Farrell's Grafton Architects, winners of a contest purposefully organized in 2001, as a new office building for Bocconi University. The building received the World Building of the Year 2008 award.

Description 
The exterior of the building is monumental and fortress-like, being almost windowless.

See also
Sarfatti Building
New SANAA Campus

References

External links

Buildings and structures in Milan
Bocconi University